A national symbol is a symbol of any entity considering and manifesting itself to the world as a national community: the sovereign states but also nations and countries in a state of colonial or other dependence, federal integration, or even an ethnocultural community considered a 'nationality' despite having no political autonomy.

National symbols intend to unite people by creating visual, verbal, or iconic representations of the national people, values, goals, or history. These symbols are often rallied around as part of celebrations of patriotism or aspiring nationalism (such as independence, autonomy or separation movements) and are designed to be inclusive and representative of all the people of the national community.

Common official national symbols 

The flag or banner of a nation-state
The coat of arms of the land or ruling dynasty
The seal or stamp of the land or ruling dynasty
The head of state, especially in a monarchy
The associated device and motto can also be used separately
The national colors, often derived from the above
Abstract symbols
National anthems, royal and imperial hymns; alongside such official hymns custom may also recognize the national symbol values of very popular songs
Some official national symbols like seals are insignias that not everybody is allowed to use.

Unofficial national symbols
 
In many ways, well-known sights in a country can also be seen as national symbols, as can traditional items of handicraft, folk costumes, natural monuments, national epics and national myths, as well as symbols used by national sports teams and their supporters.

See also 
Lists of national symbols
Cultural icon
Floral emblem
National cockade
Religion in national symbols

References